Chu Ye-jin (born October 11, 2001) is a South Korean actress. She was a contestant on Mnet's girl group survival program Produce 101.

Filmography

Television drama

Film

Television series

References

2001 births
Living people
South Korean child actresses
South Korean film actresses
South Korean female idols
South Korean television actresses
People from Bucheon
Produce 101 contestants
21st-century South Korean actresses
Fantagio artists